Fausta Simona Morganti (20 August 1944 – 2 February 2021) was a Sammarinese politician.

Political career
Morganti was the Captain Regent of San Marino, elected for the six-months term from 1 April 2005 to 1 October 2005, with Cesare Gasperoni.

She was a member of the Party of Democrats. Along with Clara Boscaglia and Marina Busignani Reffi, she was one of the first three women elected to the Grand and General Council in 1974; ultimately Reffi did not take her seat, though Boscaglia did.

Death
Morganti died from COVID-19 on 2 February 2021, aged 76 during the COVID-19 pandemic in San Marino. Her memorial service was held on 6 February after which her mother passed away at the age of 98 on the same day.

References 

1944 births
2021 deaths
21st-century women politicians
Captains Regent of San Marino
Female heads of state
Party of Democrats politicians
Sammarinese women in politics
Members of the Grand and General Council
20th-century women politicians
Deaths from the COVID-19 pandemic in San Marino